Caenides xychus, the unbranded recluse, is a species of butterfly in the family Hesperiidae. It is found in Sierra Leone, Ivory Coast, Ghana, Cameroon, the Republic of the Congo, the Central African Republic, the Democratic Republic of the Congo and Uganda. The habitat consists of dense forests.

References

Butterflies described in 1891
Hesperiinae
Butterflies of Africa